Life Flight, or Life Flight Trust, is a charitable trust providing an emergency air ambulance and rescue helicopter service that operates out of Wellington, New Zealand. Their services include the Wellington-based BK117 Westpac Rescue Helicopter, as well as two nationwide J32 Jetstream air ambulance planes that transport patients who are critically ill and in need of hospital transfer for specialist care. The majority of patients are from the central or lower North Island, or the upper South Island of New Zealand.

History

In 1975 Peter Button and Dr Russell Worth launched The Life Flight Trust, which would go on to save over 36,000 New Zealanders.

In 1982, Peter Button was recognised with an Officer of the Order of the British Empire (OBE). On 18 November 1987, Peter received a Queen’s Gallantry Medal for bravery after police launch Lady Elizabeth II capsized in heavy seas at the entrance to Wellington Harbour whilst on a training mission. Despite the appalling conditions Button and his son Clive managed to save two of the four crew members.

On 20 November 1987, two days after receiving his Queen's Gallantry Medal, Button was piloting Bell JetRanger ZK-HKF on a flight with local photographer Ronald Woolf and property developer Dion Savage. Police called in the helicopter to assist tracking an offender who had escaped from Rimutaka Prison. During the search Button's helicopter drifted into high voltage transmission lines, lost both rotor blades, and crashed in Churton Park killing all three on board. Known as the heart and soul of the helicopter rescue service, thousands of people lined the streets of Wellington for the memorial service. A cortege of helicopters flew overhead to honour the nation’s loss. The Governor-General, Sir Paul Reeves, became patron of The Life Flight Trust and launched a public appeal in Peter’s memory.

Equipment

Westpac Rescue Helicopter

The Westpac Rescue Helicopter is a BK117 emergency air rescue service which operates out of Wellington Hospital. It is used primarily for search and rescue but may also be used for police and bomb squad operations, or in firefighting. The helicopter often rescues car accident victims, injured trampers stranded in the bush, or performs rescues in other areas which are a considerable distance from any nearby hospital.

Life Flight is partially government funded. For each mission, $4000 NZD must be raised from the community. These donations are provided by individuals and companies across New Zealand.

Air ambulance

Life Flight's J32 Jetstream air ambulance, ZK-LFW, replaced their older Metroliner plane in 2012. A second aircraft of the same type, ZK-LFT, was purchased in 2017 to meet rising demand. Both carry patients between hospitals around New Zealand to receive specialist medical care. The service flies an average of four emergency trips to hospitals around New Zealand per day.

Pilot Ian Pirie commented that flying patients by air presents unique challenges, such as ensuring soft landings for patients with spinal injuries, or flying very low with patients with brain or diving injuries. He commented that calls involving premature babies were often the most rewarding, as he was often able to see how much they had grown when later flying them home after weeks in hospital incubators. The plane is even equipped to deliver babies on board, if necessary.

Charity fundraising
As Life Flight Trust is a charitable trust, it receives funding through donations. Community fundraisers to raise funds for the service are often organised by individuals or groups such as Westpac bank, or other local clubs and organisations.

Other fundraising events are often put on by Life Flight itself and funds are also raised by word of mouth, online donations, and telemarketing. Due to the service's high-profile among New Zealand's rescue services, other lower profile services such as the Taranaki Air Ambulance and the Nelson Marlborough Rescue Helicopter Trust have been confused for the service, and sometimes miss out on donations as a result.

TV show
Life Flight was the subject of a reality TV documentary show in 2013 that ran for 10 episodes. A second season ran in 2016, also running for 10 episodes.

See also
Auckland Rescue Helicopter Trust
Northland Emergency Services Trust
Otago Rescue Helicopter Trust
Piha Surf Life Saving Club

References

Air ambulance services in New Zealand
Charities based in New Zealand